Othon Sigfrido Reyes Morales (born September 3, 1960 in San Salvador), is a Salvadoran politician. He served as President of the Legislative Assembly of El Salvador from 2011 to 2015.

Early life and education
He completed his undergraduate studies at the Instituto Nacional Francisco Menendez, and 1978 was recognized as First Bachelor of the Republic of El Salvador. During the Civil War, was part of the Salvadoran Communist Party. After the conflict, academic studies in various institutions such as INCAE and the Universidad Centroamericana "José Simeón Cañas". At the University of El Salvador, received a Bachelor's degree in Foreign Internacionales.2

Political career 
As part of the political party Farabundo Martí National Liberation Front (FMLN), which is a founding member, has played diverter 2 positions including: Secretary of Communications of the FMLN National Council Member, Political and Diplomatic Commission of the FMLN, Deputy Central American Parliament period 1996 - 2001, and 2001 - 2006, Deputy Owner by the Department of San Salvador in El Salvador's Legislative Assembly, the period 2006 - 2009, and 2009 - 2011, where he was Senior Vice President of the Board.

Reyes became President of the Salvadoran Parliament February 1, 2011, following the modification of a "protocol of understanding" between the factions of the FMLN, GANA and PCN, which stipulated that Ciro Cruz Zepeda (PCN) give up the position.

In January 2020, a judge in El Salvador asked Interpol to issue a red note detention order for Sigfrido Reyes, the former president of the country’s congress, and three other people on corruption allegations.

The press office for the court in San Salvador confirmed the decision came after a hearing in the case of 14 people accused of laundering $6.5 million, defrauding the state in land purchases and appropriation of government funds. Sigfrido Reyes is currently a fugitive and his whereabouts are unknown.

References

2. https://www.sfchronicle.com/news/article/El-Salvador-asks-Interpol-to-help-detain-14980999.php

Living people
1960 births
Presidents of the Legislative Assembly of El Salvador
Farabundo Martí National Liberation Front politicians
Central American University alumni
University of El Salvador alumni
20th-century Salvadoran politicians
21st-century Salvadoran politicians